The forest Sami are Sami people who live  in the woods and who, unlike the reindeer-herding Sami people (the "fell Sami"), do not move up into the fells during the summer season. Historically, there have been forest Sami in Sweden in the area ranging from northern Ångermanland to the far north. In the early 1600s the term granlapp was also used to refer to the Sami people who paid taxes only to Sweden, compared to the semi-nomadic fell Sami, who, since they worked in the fells that straddled the Swedish-Norwegian border, had to pay taxes to both countries. When Ernst Manker studied the life of the forest Sami in the early 20th century, nearly all of their habitations had been abandoned. Only one forest Sami village remained, in Malå in Västerbotten, an area known as Stenundslandet in Anundsjö.

Background
Historically, there were forest Sami in the northern parts of Ångermanland and further north in Sweden. The two southernmost Sami regions, Åsele and Lycksele, were not inhabited by fell Sami prior to 1606, but rather only by forest Sami, as was the Kemi lappmark in modern Finland. The forest Sami in Kemi, Åsele, and Lycksele became assimilated into Finnish and Swedish society beginning in the 17th century. There are still forest Sami cultures present in the woods in Norrbotten and in Malå in Västerbotten  and in central Lapland of Finland.

Granlappar
By the 1500s, there was already a difference between the forest Sami and the fell Sami. The forest Sami remained in the lowlands in summer, pasturing their reindeer in bogs, while the fell Sami moved their herds high onto the fells, above the tree line, for summer pasturage. At that time, the forest Sami were called granlappar (Spruce Lapps). As a result of this cultural divide, the two groups were subject to different forms of taxation. In 1585 Olof Andersson Burman, a government liaison to the Sami (lappfogde) in Luleå and Piteå, wrote: 

This meant that taxation was based on whether a person was a forest Sami or part of another Sami community. In the early 17th century, the term granlapp also referred to Sami people who were taxed only by Sweden, while the fell Sami could be taxed in both Sweden and Norway, as the fells in which they grazed their reindeer included land in both countries.

Forest Sami villages
Due to laws adopted in 1886 about the hunting of reindeer, some villages were established for easier administration of reindeer herding. For example, ten forest Sami villages near the town of Vittangi used the same name. These were located in Gällivare, Jokkmove, Ståkke, Arjeplog, Malmesjaur, Eastern Kikkejaur, the western parts of Kikkejaur and Mausjaur, and Malå.

In 1956, the Swedish Sami village in Jokkmokk was dismantled, as reindeer herding was halted in the area. Instead, two separate Sami villages were established in the southern and northern parts of Jokkmokk.

Distribution and numbers
In Piteå in 1553, 47% of the Sami population were forest Sami. In 1555, in Luleå, 73% were taxpaying forest Sami and 35% other Sami people. Similar differences in population size between the two groups continued throughout the 16th century.

Petrus Læstadius wrote in his journal in 1827 that the forest Sami had by that point become fewer than the Sami people. Nevertheless, he noted that in Arvidsjaur the population were still all forest Sami, with significant populations also in Arjeplog, Jokkmokk. and Gällivare.

In 1882, a committee was formed to investigate the situation of the Sami people in Sweden, and further data was made public:
In Enonstekis, there were two forest Sami families from Pajala with 600 reindeer.
In Jukkasjärvi, there were three forest Sami families with about 500 reindeer.
In Gällivare, there was a bigger population of forest Sami at 6,500.
In Jokkmokk, there were two forest Sami villages.
In Arjeplog, there were forest Sami families who had stopped herding reindeer and started fishing instead.

Visten

Until the early 1900s forest Sami were spread over large geographic areas, with each household having its own territory. In each territory, there were settlements known as visten, each with a goahti, a Sami hut or tent. When Ernst Manker studied the forest Sami during the first decade of the 20th century, almost every viste had been abandoned for abodes that looked more like the homes of the Swedish majority culture: houses and farms.

Fishing and hunting origin
The forest Sami paid taxes that were different from those paid by the fell Sami in the 17th century based on their different modes of subsistence. Forest Sami during this period lived a less nomadic life, since they were less involved with herding reindeer. In the 1670s Samuel Rheen said that the forest Sami in Jokkmokk lived mostly on hunting and fishing. Nicolaus Lundius reported in the same period from Umeå that the forest Sami had less money than other Sami people.

A few forest Sami were reindeer owners in the 17th century. A protocol issued in 1699 stipulated that Ture Turesson was the owner of 100 reindeer in Rusksele.

Religion

Very little is known about the religious beliefs of the forest Sami in pre-Christian times. It is known is that they believed in nature spirits, and that meaningful places, such as mountains and lakes, had their own spirit world. The male head of each family used a ceremonial drum to contact that spirit world. There were also noaidis, who were men considered more capable of establishing contact with the spirits. Bears were known to be part of a special cult, and the forest Sami people had intricate ceremonies revolving around them.

Languages
Most forest Sami people used Swedish as their main language, but the Sami language was also used to a certain degree. In Luleå, both the forest Sami and other Sami people also spoke the Lule Sami language. In Piteå the fell Sami spoke the Pite Sami language, while the local forest Sami spoke mostly Swedish or the Ume Sami language. The forest Sami in Malå and eastern Sorsele also spoke Ume Sami.

In Lycksele and Åsele the forest Sami were almost entirely assimilated into Swedish society during the 19th century. Their old language was permanently lost. Sami literature from the 17th and 18th centuries, by Olaus Stephani Graan and Pehr Fjällström, respectively, demonstrate that at that time there were still many speakers of Ume Sami. The spread of the Ume Sami language is discussed by J.A. Nensen in the 19th century, when the forest Sami in Åsöee used a dialect considered a variety of Ume Sami. Nensen stated that their language was clearly separate from the southern dialect of the Sami languages, which was used by the other Sami population in Vilhelmina.

End of forest Sami culture
With the decline of reindeer herding in large parts of Norrland, the forest Sami culture almost disappeared, since they no longer continued their traditional lifestyle. In Kemi, Finland, the Finnish forest Sami for the most part lost their distinct identity and were assimilated into the other Sami groups, adopting their languages. Similar changes occurred in Åsele and Lycksele during the 18th century.

Stensundslandet
Only one forest Sami village, Stenundslandet in Malå, survived into the 19th century. Nils Persson (1804–1880) was the last known forest Sami to continue in the traditional lifestyle. In 1842 Persson received authorization from the municipal leaders to conduct reindeer work, which he continued until his death. The reindeer business was subsequently taken over by his daughter Sara Johanna and her husband Lars Jonsson, but they eventually abandoned the traditional lifestyle.

See also

Karin Stenberg

References

Social history of Sweden
Sámi people